Bartnik is a surname of Polish origin, meaning "bee keeper". Notable people with the surname include:

Robert Bartnik, Australian mathematician
Tomasz Bartnik (born 1990), Polish sport shooter
Wojciech Bartnik (born 1967), Polish former southpaw boxer

See also
Bartnick